Opopanax is a genus of plants in the family Apiaceae.

Species 
Opopanax include four species:
Opopanax chironium (L.) W.D.J.Koch
Opopanax hispidus (Friv.) Griseb.
Opopanax persicus Boiss.
Opopanax siifolius (Boiss. & Heldr.) Menemen

Etymology 
The genus name Opopanax derives from Anglo-Norman opopanac, from Latin opopanax, from Hellenistic Greek ὀποπάναξ, from Ancient Greek ὀπός (opos, "juice") + πάναξ (panax, "all-healing"). Therefore, opopanax literally means the juice (gum resin) of all-heal. There were many different plants called all-heal (πάνακες or panaces) in Ancient Greece and Rome. However, according to Dioscorides, opopanax was obtained specifically from a kind of all-heal named πάνακες Ἡράκλειον (panaces Heraclion, "Hercules' all-heal"), which has been identified as Opopanax chironium, O. persicus and O. hispidus

The term opopanax traditionally refers to the medicinal gum resin of Opopanax sp., but in perfumery, opopanax refers to the gum resin of an unrelated species Commiphora guidottii.

Taxonomic history
The genus was created by Wilhelm Koch based on the species Opopanax chironium, previously known as Pastinaca opopanax L. and Ferula opopanax Spreng.

References

Apioideae
Apioideae genera